
Bettmersee is a lake above Bettmeralp in the canton of Valais, Switzerland.

See also
List of mountain lakes of Switzerland

External links

Lakes of Valais